Letronne is the lava-flooded remnant of a lunar impact crater. It was named after French archaeologist Jean-Antoine Letronne. The northern part of the rim is completely missing, and opens into the Oceanus Procellarum, forming a bay along the southwestern shore. The formation is located to the northwest of the large crater Gassendi.To the west-southwest is the flooded crater Billy, and north-northwest lies the smaller Flamsteed.

The surviving rim of Letronne is now little more than a semi-circular series of ridges. The flooded, broken rim of Winthrop overlies the western wall. The rim is the most intact along the eastern stretch, forming a mountainous promontory into the mare. A small cluster of central rises lie at the midpoint of the crater. The wrinkle ridge Dorsa Rubey traverses the floor from north to south, and outlines a portion of the missing rim. The crater floor is otherwise nearly smooth and relatively free of craterlets, with the exception of Letronne B near the southeast rim.

Satellite craters
By convention these features are identified on lunar maps by placing the letter on the side of the crater midpoint that is closest to Letronne.

The following craters have been renamed by the IAU.

 Letronne D — See Scheele.
 Letronne P — See Winthrop.

References

 
 
 
 
 
 
 
 
 
 
 

Impact craters on the Moon